Tovo San Giacomo is a comune (municipality) in the Province of Savona in the Italian region Liguria, located about  southwest of Genoa and about  southwest of Savona.

Tovo San Giacomo borders the following municipalities: Borgio Verezzi, Calice Ligure, Finale Ligure, Giustenice, Magliolo, Pietra Ligure, and Rialto.

References

Cities and towns in Liguria